Aschiphasma is an Asian genus of stick insects in the tribe Aschiphasmatini and is also the type genus for the family.  Species currently have a known distribution throughout western Malesia.

Species 
Aschiphasma includes the following species:
 Aschiphasma annulipes Westwood, 1834 - type species, locality Java
 Aschiphasma piceum Redtenbacher, 1906
 synonyms: A. modestum Redtenbacher, 1906, A. viridilineatum Redtenbacher, 1906

References

External links

Phasmatodea genera
Phasmatodea of Asia